In the context of multi-leg flights, the validating carrier (a.k.a. issuing carrier) is the airline that validates or issues tickets, and the one that receives the money when the flights are booked. In the event of cancellations this is the carrier with which the flyer has credit. However, with the advent of online booking, passengers are usually unaware of who their validating carrier is. The only way to tell who the validating carrier is for a passenger to check the first three digits of his/her ticket number after booking the ticket. Airlines who are members of ARC or IATA BSP have their own prefix for airline tickets. For example, American Airlines' ticket prefix is 001, while United Airlines' prefix is 016.

See also 

Code sharing

Airline tickets